Miss America 1982, the 55th Miss America pageant, was held at the Boardwalk Hall in Atlantic City, New Jersey on September 12, 1981, on NBC Network.

Results

Order of announcements

Top 10

Preliminary awards

Non-finalist awards

Judges
 Foster Brooks
 Wink Martindale
 Evelyn Ay Sempier
 Herman Vincent
 James Lipton
 Dean Butler
 Carla Borelli
 Renee Valente

Contestants

References

External links
 Miss America official website

1982
1981 in the United States
1982 beauty pageants
1981 in New Jersey
September 1981 events in the United States
Events in Atlantic City, New Jersey